Step Forward is a Soviet film-an almanac, consisting of five novels.

Plot
Five novels, united by the history of the nascent love of two elderly people, meeting every day on the way to work. Meeting every day in public transport, they do not suspect that they are neighbors around the house, and they are constantly giving each other a lot of trouble.

Cast
Step Forward
 Lyudmila Gurchenko as Valentina Stepanovna
 Nikolay Volkov Jr.  as Igor Anatolievich
 Yelena Anderegg as janitor

The Captain's Daughter
 Andrey Popov as   captain
 Yelena Tsyplakova as Lida, captain's daughter, student
 Georgy Vitsin as   man in  buffet
 Lyudmila Ivanova as taxi driver
 Vera Titova as  barmaid
 Anatoly Popov as  student
 Natalia Chetverikova as   girl at  airport

Father Seraphim
 Yevgeny Leonov as Seraphim Nikitich, engineer
 Valentina Vladimirova as Maria Timofeevna, his wife
 Yelena Solovey as Tatyana
 Semyon Morozov as assistant engineer
  Valentina Telegina as nurse in  hospital
 Olesya Ivanova as stationmaster

Meat in Argentine
Lev Durov as  Georgy Dmitrievich, cook
Valentina Titova as his wife
Vladimir Basov as  Nikolay Borisovich Streshnikov, saxophonist

Wedding March
Yelena Drapeko as Katya Zaitseva
Boris Shcherbakov as Vovka Monastyryov, her fiance
Anatoly Rudakov as Sergey 
Svetlana Vadas as Vera 
Stanislav Sokolov as seller

Total for 30 kopecks
 Andrei Mironov  as Markel Vladimirovich Kochetkov, dentist
 Yekaterina Vasilyeva as Lyuba, his wife
 Pavel Pankov as Alexander Yevgenievich, head physician
 Alexander Anisimov as taxi driver
 Sergey Boyarsky as lottery ticket seller
 Vladimir Zemlyanikin  as correspondent   
 Natalya Krachkovskaya as winner of  lottery
Svetlana Karpinskaya as a nurse
Kira Kreylis-Petrova as  controller in a supermarket
Igor Okrepilov as doctor 
Inna Slobodskaya as dentist
Lidia Shtykan as worker of  supermarket
Kirill Hunn as patient with a cane  
Era Ziganshina as  saleswoman

Filming
Some episodes of  film were shot at the stations of  Saint Petersburg Metro Narvskaya and Dachnoye.

References

External links

 Step Forward (1975)

Lenfilm films
Soviet romantic comedy films
1975 romantic comedy films
Russian anthology films
1975 films